John Shelley may refer to:

John Shelley (illustrator) (born 1959), British illustrator
John Shelley (MP) for Rye
John F. Shelley (1905–1974), US politician
John L. Shelley, Ace Books author
 Sir John Shelley, 4th Baronet (1692–1771), British politician
 Sir John Shelley, 5th Baronet (1730–1783), British politician 
 Sir John Shelley, 6th Baronet (1771–1852), English landowner, politician and amateur cricketer
 Sir John Shelley, 7th Baronet (1808–1867), English landowner and politician